Men have contested events at the World Athletics Championships since its inauguration in 1983. The top three athletes in each event win gold, silver and bronze medals, respectively. A one-off edition of the championships was held in 1976 for the men's 50 kilometres race walk only, as the International Olympic Committee excluded that event for the Olympic athletics programme that year.

Track

100 m

200 m

400 m

800 m

1500 m

5000 m

10,000 m

110 m hurdles

400 m hurdles

3000 m steeplechase

4 × 100 metres relay

4 × 400 metres relay

4 × 400 metres mixed relay

Road

Marathon

20 km walk

35 km walk

50 km walk

Field

High jump

Pole vault

Long jump

Triple jump

Shot put

Discus throw

Javelin throw

Hammer throw

Decathlon

See also
List of Olympic medalists in athletics (men)
List of World Championships in Athletics medalists (women)
List of men's Olympic and World Championship athletics sprint champions

References

IAAF World Championships in Athletics. GBR Athletics. Retrieved on 2015-07-04.

External links
IAAF official website

World Athletics Championships
Men
World Championships men
World Championships in Athletics medalists
World Championships medalists